The 1908 Cincinnati Reds season was a season in American baseball. The team finished fifth in the National League with a record of 73–81, 26 games behind the Chicago Cubs.

Offseason 
After two straight seasons in which the Reds lost 87 games, the team replaced manager Ned Hanlon with player-manager John Ganzel. This was the first managerial job of Ganzel's career at the major league level.

Regular season 
Cincinnati had a new starting shortstop, as Rudy Hulswitt took over the position. Hulswitt had spent the 1907 season with the Columbus Senators of the American Association, where he hit .296 with two home runs, 35 doubles and fourteen triples. He had last played in the major leagues with the Philadelphia Phillies in 1904, where he hit .244 with a homer and 36 RBI.

The Reds' 1906 shortstop, Hans Lobert, moved to third base, while Mike Mowrey came off the bench. Outfielders Dode Paskert and John Kane became starting outfielders as Art Kruger and Fred Odwell joined the Columbus Senators in the American Association. Bob Spade, who was acquired by the Reds late in the 1907 season from the Atlanta Crackers of the Southern Association, was given a regular spot in the starting rotation. Spade was 18–12 with the Crackers in 1907 before going 1–2 with a 1.00 ERA in three starts with Cincinnati in September.

Lobert led the way offensively, hitting a team high .293 with four home runs, 63 RBI, 71 runs scored and 167 hits. Ganzel hit .250 with a homer and 53 RBI, while Miller Huggins hit .239 with no homers and 23 RBI.

Bob Ewing anchored the pitching staff once again, as he was 17–15 with a 2.21 ERA in 37 games. Spade had a solid season, going 17–12 with a 2.74 ERA, while Andy Coakley only had a record of 8–18, however, he led the team with a 1.86 ERA before being traded to the Chicago Cubs late in the season.

Season summary 
The Reds got off to a better start in 1908, and saw themselves in second place with an 18–14 record after thirty-two games, two games behind the Chicago Cubs. A run of 8–3 in their next eleven games saw Cincinnati close the gap to one game, however, the Reds then lost their next five games to fall into third place, five games behind the Cubs. As the season progressed, the Reds continued to drop in the standings, and eventually fall under the .500 mark. At the end of the season, the Reds had a 73–81 record, 26 games behind the first place Cubs. The 73 wins was the highest total by the Reds since winning 79 games in 1905.

Season standings

Record vs. opponents

Notable transactions 
 July 8, 1908: Bob Spade was claimed off waivers from the Reds by the New York Giants.
 July 10, 1908: Jake Weimer and Dave Brain were traded by the Reds to the New York Giants for Bob Spade and $5,000.

Roster

Player stats

Batting

Starters by position 
Note: Pos = Position; G = Games played; AB = At bats; H = Hits; Avg. = Batting average; HR = Home runs; RBI = Runs batted in

Other batters 
Note: G = Games played; AB = At bats; H = Hits; Avg. = Batting average; HR = Home runs; RBI = Runs batted in

Pitching

Starting pitchers 
Note: G = Games pitched; IP = Innings pitched; W = Wins; L = Losses; ERA = Earned run average; SO = Strikeouts

Other pitchers 
Note: G = Games pitched; IP = Innings pitched; W = Wins; L = Losses; ERA = Earned run average; SO = Strikeouts

Relief pitchers 
Note: G = Games pitched; W = Wins; L = Losses; SV = Saves; ERA = Earned run average; SO = Strikeouts

Cuban-American Major League Clubs Series 
The Reds competed in the inaugural Cuban-American Major League Clubs Series, playing against three teams from the Cuban League. The Almendares club finished with the best record in the series.

Notes

References 
1908 Cincinnati Reds season at Baseball Reference

Cincinnati Reds seasons
Cincinnati Reds season
Cincinnati Reds